The Royal College of Psychiatrists is the main professional organisation of psychiatrists in the United Kingdom, and is responsible for representing psychiatrists, for psychiatric research and for providing public information about mental health problems. The college provides advice to those responsible for training and certifying psychiatrists in the UK.

In addition to publishing many books and producing several journals, the college produces, for the public, information about mental health problems. Its offices are located at 21 Prescot Street in London, near Aldgate. The college's previous address was Belgrave Square.

History
The college has existed in various forms since 1841, having started as the Association of Medical Officers of Asylums and Hospitals for the Insane. In 1865 it became the Medico-Psychological Association. In 1926, the association received its royal charter, becoming the Royal Medico-Psychological Association. In 1971, a supplemental charter gave the association the name of the Royal College of Psychiatrists.

Membership
Several grades of membership are available:
 Members use the post-nominal letters MRCPsych.
 Affiliateship offers psychiatrists in the UK, who are not in training grades or substantive consultant posts, the opportunity of involvement with the college.
 Specialist associateship of the college is open to registered medical practitioners working in the United Kingdom and who meet certain criteria.
 Fellowship uses the post-nominal letters FRCPsych. Fellowship is awarded to a member who has made a significant and distinctive contribution to psychiatry. It is not normally awarded until the nominee has held the membership for a minimum of ten years. The process by which members are awarded Fellowship of the college is that they should be nominated, proposed and seconded by two members of the college.
 International associateship may be awarded to psychiatrists with five years' experience in psychiatry who do not hold the MRCPsych, but who hold a specialist qualification in psychiatry and who reside outside the UK.

Coat of arms
The coat of arms incorporates the traditional serpent-entwined Rod of Asclepius symbolic of medicine, and butterflies associated with Psyche. Previous to the grant of these arms, the Medico-Psychological Association had used a device showing the seated Psyche with butterfly's wings. The arms were originally granted to the Royal Medico-Psychological Association in 1926, and were confirmed to the college on its formation in 1971 by the College of Arms. They were also registered in Scotland by the Court of the Lord Lyon.

College Centre for Quality Improvement
The work of the College Centre for Quality Improvement (CCQI) has developed a role for clinicians and their professional bodies in raising standards. Its national initiatives engage directly with clinicians, managers and service users and support them to take responsibility for improving local mental health services. More than 90% of mental health services in the UK participate in the work of the CCQI.

Policy and campaigns
One of the college's principal aims is to influence and develop policy on areas that contribute to supporting better outcomes for people with mental illness. This is accomplished through the publication of policy briefings, data analysis (such as Mental Health Watch), as well as College Reports and Position Statements. This work encourages changes to government and stakeholder policy and clinical practice on a particular issue associated with psychiatry, as well as, providing professional advice to support RCPsych members in their work.

The college also runs campaigns, including Choose Psychiatry, which has helped increase the fill rate of posts from 78% in 2018 to 100% in 2020, as well as calling for parity in the funding of mental health services.

List of presidents of the Royal College of Psychiatrists
The president is elected for a three-year term and serves as head of the Royal College of Psychiatrists. The current president is Dr Adrian James.
 Professor Martin Roth (1971 to 1975)
 Professor Linford Rees (1975 to 1978)
 Professor Desmond Pond (1978 to 1981)
 Professor Kenneth Rawnsley (1981 to 1984)
 Dr Thomas Bewley (1984 to 1987)
 Dr James Leatham Tennant Birley (1987 to 1990)
 Professor Andrew Sims (1990 to 1993)
 Dr Fiona Caldicott (1993 to 1996); first female president
 Professor Robert Evan Kendell (1996 to 1999)
 Professor John Cox (1999 to 2002)
 Dr Mike Shooter (2002 to 2005)
 Professor Sheila Hollins (2005 to 2008)
 Professor Dinesh Bhugra (2008 to 2011)
 Professor Dame Susan Bailey (2011 to 2014)
 Professor Sir Simon Wessely (2014 to 2017)
 Professor Wendy Burn (2017 to 2020)
 Dr Adrian James (2020 to present)

See also
 Academy of Medical Royal Colleges
 American Psychiatric Association
 Eleanora Fleury, first female member of the Medico Psychological Association
 List of psychiatrists
 Royal College of Physicians
 Mental health in the United Kingdom

References
Footnotes

Bibliography

External links 
 
 Information about mental health problems
 Access the journals online

Educational institutions established in 1841
Medical associations based in the United Kingdom
Mental health organisations in the United Kingdom
Psychiatric associations
Psychiatrists
1841 establishments in the United Kingdom